Million Dollar Listing Los Angeles (previously Million Dollar Listing) is an American reality television series on Bravo that debuted on August 29, 2006. The series chronicles the professional and personal lives of six real estate agents — Josh Flagg, Madison Hildebrand, Josh Altman, James Harris, David Parnes, and Tracy Tutor Maltas — based in Beverly Hills, Hollywood, and Malibu, California as they sell high-end properties. It also gives viewers an inside look at the world of high-priced real estate in Los Angeles County. The series has three spin-offs, Million Dollar Listing New York, which premiered on March 7, 2012, Million Dollar Listing Miami, which premiered June 25, 2014, and Million Dollar Listing San Francisco, which premiered July 8, 2015.

Series overview

Episodes

Season 1 (2006)

Season 2 (2008)

Season 3 (2009)

Season 4 (2011)

Season 5 (2012)

Season 6 (2013)

Season 7 (2014)

Season 8 (2015)

Season 9 (2016)

Season 10 (2017-18)

Season 11 (2019)

Season 12 (2020)

Season 13 (2021)

Josh & Josh (2021-22)

Season 14 (2022-23)

References

Million Dollar Listing Los Angeles